Ariosoma sazonovi is an eel in the family Congridae (conger/garden eels). It was described by Emma Stanislavovna Karmovskaya in 2004. It is a marine, deep water-dwelling eel which is known from the Philippines, in the western Pacific Ocean. It is known to dwell at a depth range of 160–440 metres. Females can reach a maximum total length of 39.5 centimetres.

The species epithet was given in honour of Yurii Sazonov.

References

sazonovi
Fish described in 2004